Felipe ha gli occhi azzurri is an Italian television series.

See also
List of Italian television series

External links
 

Italian television series
1991 Italian television series debuts
1990s Italian television series